Shinga is a high-mountain village in Lauricocha Province, in the Huánuco Region of Peru.  It lies at an elevation of 4001 meters on a tributary of the Rio Huayhuash.

Notes

Populated places in Peru